Stephen Warren Bosworth (December 4, 1939 – January 4, 2016) was an American academic and diplomat. He served as Dean of The Fletcher School at Tufts University and served as United States Special Representative for North Korea Policy from March 2009 to October 2011. He served three times as a U.S. Ambassador, to Tunisia (1979–1981), to the Philippines (1984–1987), and to South Korea (1997–2001). In 1987, he received the American Academy of Diplomacy's Diplomat of the Year Award.

In February 2009, U.S. Secretary of State Hillary Clinton named Bosworth a Special Representative for North Korea policy.

Early life and education
Bosworth was born in Grand Rapids, Michigan in 1939. He graduated with a B.A. in international relations (1961) and an honorary doctorate (1986) from Dartmouth College. He was also a graduate student at George Washington University. He has two brothers, Brian Bosworth (head of the corporation FutureWorks) and Barry Bosworth (involved in advertisement).

Private career

Prior to 1984, his previous foreign service assignments include Paris, Madrid, Panama City, and Washington, D.C. where he was the State Department's Director of Policy Planning, Principal Deputy Assistant Secretary for inter-American affairs, and Deputy Assistant Secretary for Economic Affairs.

He was a member of the International Board of Advisers for the President of the Philippines, and also a member of the boards of International Textile Group and Franklin Templeton Investment Trust Management Co. (Korea). He was a member of the Trilateral Commission.

At times he has held teaching and oversight positions at various colleges and universities: Columbia University's School of International and Public Affairs (1990–1994); Linowitz Chair of International Studies, Hamilton College (1993); Trustee, Dartmouth College (1992–2002), Chairman of Board of Trustees, (1996–1999).

Before his appointment as ambassador to South Korea, he was the executive director of the Korean Peninsula Energy Development Organization (1995–1997). Before coming to KEDO, he was president of the United States Japan Foundation.

Political career
He served on the executive committee of Americans Elect, a political party seeking to gain ballot access in every state in 2012.

Personal life
Bosworth was married to Sandra De Puit, with whom he had a son and a daughter, but ended in a divorce. From 1984 until his death in 2016, he was married to Christine Holmes, from whom he had two stepchildren.

Death
On January 4, 2016, Bosworth died at the age of 76 due to pancreatic cancer in Boston, Massachusetts.

Writings

References

External links

 
 Ambassador Bosworth Speaks on North Korea Policy at The Korea Society's 2009 Annual Dinner
 Stephen Bosworth on the Korean Conflict, selected quotes, National Campaign to End the Korean War
 U.S. Department of State: Biography of Stephen W. Bosworth
 

1939 births
2016 deaths
Ambassadors of the United States to the Philippines
Ambassadors of the United States to South Korea
Ambassadors of the United States to Tunisia
Americans Elect people
Columbia University faculty
Dartmouth College alumni
Deaths from pancreatic cancer
Directors of Policy Planning
Experts on North Korea
The Fletcher School at Tufts University faculty
George Washington University alumni
Hamilton College (New York) faculty
People from Grand Rapids, Michigan
Recipients of the Order of the Rising Sun, 2nd class
20th-century American diplomats
21st-century American diplomats